Nuria Zufía Elizalde is a former Spanish football who played as a forward. She played for SD Lagunak, Rayo Vallecano (with whom she won two leagues) and AD Torrejón in Spain and Clemson Tigers in the United States. She retired at 26.

She won the 2004 U-19 European Championship and scored Spain's first goal at the subsequent U-20 World Cup.

References

1985 births
Living people
Footballers from Pamplona
Spanish women's footballers
Women's association football forwards
SD Lagunak (women) players
Clemson Tigers women's soccer players
Rayo Vallecano Femenino players
AD Torrejón CF Femenino players
Primera División (women) players
Spain women's youth international footballers
Spanish expatriate women's footballers
Spanish expatriate sportspeople in the United States
Expatriate women's soccer players in the United States